The 13307 /13308 Ganga Sutlej Express is an Express train belonging to Indian Railways that run between  and  in India.

Background 
It is named after two Indian Rivers; Ganga (which flows in the holy city of Varanasi, also Chhapra) and Sutlej (a river which flows in the northern states of Punjab and Himachal Pradesh).

Service 
It operates as train number 13307 from Dhanbad Junction to Firozpur Cantonment and as train number 13308 in the reverse direction, serving the states of Jharkhand, Bihar, Uttar Pradesh, Haryana & Punjab.

Coaches

The service presently has 8 Sleeper Class & 6 General Unreserved coaches in addition to a couple of High Capacity Parcel Van coaches.

Routing
,
,

Traction

References

External links
13307 Ganga Sutlej Express at India Rail Info
13308 Ganga Sutlej Express at India Rail Info

Transport in Dhanbad
Transport in Firozpur
Named passenger trains of India
Rail transport in Jharkhand
Rail transport in Bihar
Rail transport in Uttar Pradesh
Rail transport in Haryana
Rail transport in Punjab, India
Express trains in India